Type A Films was a film production company founded by actress and producer Reese Witherspoon in 2000.

History
Witherspoon wanted to start her own company to be able to produce quality films for young women. Her success with Legally Blonde allowed Type A Films to expand and get more recognition in the industry. Before Jennifer Simpson became its president in 2002, she was the head of development and production for Barry Mendel Productions where she worked on films, such as The Sixth Sense and The Royal Tenenbaums.

In 2012, the company merged with Bruna Papandrea's Make Movies banner to create a new production company entitled Pacific Standard. In November 2016, Witherspoon, Seth Rodsky and Otter Media formed Hello Sunshine, of which Pacific Standard became a subsidiary.

The company gets its name from an early nickname of Witherspoon's "Little Miss Type A".

Filmography

References

Reese Witherspoon
Mass media companies established in 2000
Mass media companies disestablished in 2012
Film production companies of the United States